India's Laughter Champion is an Indian reality stand-up comedy series produced by Banijay Asia. The show is broadcast on Sony Entertainment Television since 11 June 2022. The show is hosted by Rochelle Rao, while Shekhar Suman and Archana Puran Singh are the judges. It replaced The Kapil Sharma Show. It aired its finale on 27 August 2022. It was won by Rajat Sood.

Concept
The show is based on a format where stand-up comedians perform and entertain judges.

Judges 
 Shekhar Suman
 Archana Puran Singh

Guests (for few episodes) 

 Shilpa Shetty
 Vijay Deverakonda
 Rajkummar Rao
 Taapsee Pannu
 Mithali Raj

Contestants 
Rajat Sood- 
Nitesh Shetty- 
Vighnesh Pandey- 
Jayvijay Sachan- 
Ketan Sharma 
Gaurav Dubey
Hemant Pandey
Abhay Sharma
Shambhu Shikhar 
Abdar Khan
Mujawar Malegaowi 
Himanshu Bawandar
Jaswant Singh Rathore

Laughter ke SIRpanch 

 Rajpal Yadav 
 Sugandha Mishra
 Sunil Grover
 Raju Srivastav
 Jamie Lever
 Suresh Albela
 Rajeev Nigam
 Sardar Pratap Faujdar
 Surender Sharma
 Arun Gemini
 Dr. Tushar Shah
 Gurpreet Ghuggi
 Chetan Shashital

See also  
 List of programs broadcast by Sony Entertainment Television

References

External links 
 India's Laughter Champion on SonyLIV
 India’s Laughter Champion on MX Player
 India's Laughter Champion on Sony Entertainment Television

Indian stand-up comedy television series
2022 Indian television series debuts
2020s Indian television series
Hindi-language television shows
Sony Entertainment Television original programming